Ivo Perelman (born January 12, 1961) is a Brazilian free jazz saxophonist born in São Paulo.

Career
In his youth, Perelman learned to play guitar, cello, clarinet, trombone, and piano, concentrating on tenor sax since age 19. He attended the Berklee College of Music for one semester and then dropped out, moving to Los Angeles in 1986. Perelman released his first album in 1989, which featured Peter Erskine, John Patitucci, Airto Moreira, Eliane Elias, and Flora Purim as guests. After the release of his first album he moved to New York City. Perelman has released many albums since then for a number of different labels, and has played with Dominic Duval, Borah Bergman, Rashied Ali, Jay Rosen, Marilyn Crispell, Matthew Shipp, Paul Bley, Don Pullen, Fred Hopkins, Andrew Cyrille, Joanne Brackeen, Mark Helias, Billy Hart, Mino Cinelu, Nana Vasconcelos, Reggie Workman, William Parker, Louis Sclavis, John Wolf Brennan, Elton Dean, and Joe Morris.

He founded Ibeji Records in 1994 to record his own work.

Discography

 Ivo (ITM, 1989)
 The Children of Ibeji (Enja, 1991)
 Man of the Forest (GM, 1994)
 Soccer Land (Ibeji, 1994)
 Tapeba Songs (Ibeji, 1995)
 Blue Monk Variations (Cadence, 1996)
 Cama de Terra (Homestead, 1996)
 Bendito of Santa Cruz (Cadence, 1997) with Matthew Shipp
 Sad Life (Leo, 1997)
 Perelman/Parker/Ali Live (Zero In, 1997)
 Geometry (Leo, 1997)
 Slaves of Job (CIMP, 1997)
 Revelation (CIMP, 1997)
 En Adir (Music & Arts, 1997)
 Sound Hierarchy (Music & Arts, 1997)
 Strings (Leo, 1997)
 Seeds, Visions, and Counterpoint (Leo, 1998)
 The Alexander Suite (Leo, 1998)
 Eye Listens (Boxholder, 1999)
 Sieiro (Leo, 1999)
 Brazilian Watercolor (Leo, 1999)
 The Hammer (Leo, 2000)
 The Seven Energies of the Universe (Leo, 2001)
 The Ventriloquist (Leo, 2002)
 Aquarela do Brazil (Atracao, 2002)
 Olha Ze (Rob, 2003)
 Suite for Helen F. (Boxholder, 2003)
 Black on White (Clean Feed, 2004)
 Introspection (Leo, 2006)
 Soul Calling (Cadence, 2006)
 Near to the Wild Heart (Not Two, 2010)
 Soulstorm (Clean Feed, 2010)
 The Apple in the Dark (Leo, 2010) with Gerry Hemingway
 The Hour of the Star (Leo, 2011) with Matthew Shipp, Joe Morris, & Gerald Cleaver
 Family Ties (Leo, 2012) with Joe Morris & Gerald Cleaver
 The Passion According to G.H. (Leo, 2012) with Sirius Quartet
 The Foreign Legion (Leo, 2012) with Matthew Shipp & Gerald Cleaver
 The Clairvoyant (Leo, 2012) with Matthew Shipp & Whit Dickey
 Living Jelly (Leo, 2012) with Joe Morris & Gerald Cleaver
 The Gift (Leo, 2012) with Matthew Shipp & Michael Bisio
 One (RareNoise, 2013) with Joe Morris & Balázs Pándi
 A Violent Dose of Anything (Leo, 2013) with Matthew Shipp & Mat Maneri
 Enigma (Leo, 2013) with Matthew Shipp, Whit Dickey, & Gerald Cleaver
 Serendipity (Leo, 2013) with Matthew Shipp, William Parker, & Gerald Cleaver
 The Edge (Leo, 2013) with Matthew Shipp, Michael Bisio, & Whit Dickey
 The Art of the Duet, Volume One (Leo, 2013) with Matthew Shipp
 Two Men Walking (Leo, 2014) with Mat Maneri
 Book of Sound (Leo, 2014) with Matthew Shipp & William Parker
 The Other Edge (Leo, 2014) with Matthew Shipp, Michael Bisio, & Whit Dickey
 Reverie (Leo, 2014) with Karl Berger
 Tenorhood (Leo, 2015) with Whit Dickey
 Callas (Leo, 2015) with Matthew Shipp
 Counterpoint (Leo, 2015) with Mat Maneri & Joe Morris
 Butterfly Whispers (Leo, 2015) with Matthew Shipp & Whit Dickey
 Villa Lobos Suite (Leo, 2015) with Mat Maneri & Tanya Kalmanovitch
 Complementary Colors (Leo, 2015) with Matthew Shipp
 Corpo (Leo, 2016) with Matthew Shipp
 Soul (Leo, 2016) with Matthew Shipp, Michael Bisio & Whit Dickey
 Blue (Leo, 2016) with Joe Morris
 The Hitchhiker (Leo, 2016) with Karl Berger
 Breaking Point (Leo, 2016) with Mat Maneri, Joe Morris & Gerald Cleaver
 The Art of the Improv Trio Volume 1 (Leo, 2016) with Karl Berger & Gerald Cleaver
 The Art of the Improv Trio Volume 2 (Leo, 2016) with Mat Maneri & Whit Dickey
 The Art of the Improv Trio Volume 3 (Leo, 2016) with Matthew Shipp & Gerald Cleaver
 The Art of the Improv Trio Volume 4 (Leo, 2016) with William Parker & Gerald Cleaver
 The Art of the Improv Trio Volume 5 (Leo, 2016) with Joe Morris & Gerald Cleaver
 The Art of the Improv Trio Volume 6 (Leo, 2016) with Joe Morris & Gerald Cleaver
 The Art of Perelman-Shipp Volume 1: Titan (Leo, 2017) with Matthew Shipp & William Parker
 The Art of Perelman-Shipp Volume 2: Tarvos (Leo, 2017) with Matthew Shipp & Bobby Kapp
 The Art of Perelman-Shipp Volume 3: Pandora (Leo, 2017) with Matthew Shipp, William Parker, & Whit Dickey
 The Art of Perelman-Shipp Volume 4: Hyperion (Leo, 2017) with Matthew Shipp, & Michael Bisio
 The Art of Perelman-Shipp Volume 5: Rhea (Leo, 2017) with Matthew Shipp, Michael Bisio, & Whit Dickey
 The Art of Perelman-Shipp Volume 6: Saturn (Leo, 2017) with Matthew Shipp
 The Art of Perelman-Shipp Volume 7: Dione (Leo, 2017) with Matthew Shipp & Andrew Cyrille
 Live in Brussels (Leo, 2017) with Matthew Shipp
 Live in Baltimore (Leo, 2017) with Matthew Shipp & Jeff Cosgrove
 Heptagon (Leo, 2017) with Matthew Shipp, William Parker, & Bobby Kapp
 Scalene (Leo, 2017) with Matthew Shipp & Joe Hertenstein
 Philosopher's Stone (Leo, 2017) with Matthew Shipp & Nate Wooley
 Octagon (Leo, 2017) with Nate Wooley, Brandon Lopez & Gerald Cleaver
 Oneness (Leo, 2018) with Matthew Shipp
 Efflorescence (Leo, 2019) with Matthew Shipp
 Ineffable Joy (ESP-Disk, 2019) with Matthew Shipp, William Parker, & Bobby Kapp
 Strings & Voices Project (Hundred Years Gallery, 2020) with David Leahy, Pascal Marzan, Marcio Mattos, Phil Minton, Jean-Michel van Schouwburg (de), Benedict Taylor, & Phil Wachsmann
 Fruition (ESP-Disk, 2022) with Matthew Shipp

Notes

References
[ Ivo Perelman] at Allmusic

Brazilian jazz musicians
Living people
1961 births
Homestead Records artists
CIMP artists
Brazilian Jews
Jewish musicians
Cadence Jazz Records artists
Clean Feed Records artists
Leo Records artists
Music & Arts artists
RareNoiseRecords artists
Enja Records artists